Space Racers is an American CGI STEM-focused educational animated television series featuring the cadets of the Stardust Space Academy. The show began as a web series on March 22, 2011 entitled Space Race, then debuted as a television series on May 2, 2014 for public television on select PBS Kids stations. The first season was produced under the auspicies of Maryland Public Television. The second season of Space Racers debuted on October 31, 2016 as a commercial effort on NBCUniversal's Sprout, since rebranded to Universal Kids. The series is produced by Space Race, LLC. The show features contributions and fundings from NASA involving science and space technology education, and also maintains partnerships with the U.S. Space & Rocket Center and U.S. Space Camp.

The show is rated TV-Y on PBS Kids and Universal Kids, and TV-Y7 on syndication.

Premise
Space Racers is an educational animated television series. The show follows the Space Racers cadets, a group of anthropomorphic spaceships resembling and named after various species of birds, as they travel the Solar System exploring space through assigned missions. The main characters—Eagle, Hawk, Raven, Robyn, and Starling—are cadets at the Stardust Space Academy, and each episode they discover a series of space-based scientific discoveries. The cadets spend each episode traveling through outer space.

Characters

Main
 Eagle (Yuri Lowenthal) is a natural fearless leader and very fast cadet at the Stardust Space Academy endowed with much confidence, Eagle is a member and the unofficial leader of the Space Racers. He is also Hawk's best friend. Eagle is naturally competitive and rarely backs down from a challenge, is helped by his intense focus. As the fastest out of all the cadets his age, he can sometimes get a bit overconfident in himself and his skills, and it can go to his head, causing him to become a bit cocky. His natural leadership skills and confidence can also cause him to not listen to others when he thinks that his way is the best way. However, he is not afraid to admit that he has made a mistake and try to correct it.
 Hawk (Meyer DeLeeuw) is a powerful and brave cadet at the Stardust Space Academy and a member of the Space Racers. He is also Eagle's best friend. The only thing bigger than Hawk is his heart. He also has the ability to memorize anything that he sees or hears, even if he doesn't understand it!
 Raven (Johnny Yong Bosch) is an extremely fast cadet at the Stardust Space Academy who loves to race, Raven shares a healthy rivalry with Eagle, who is regarded as the fastest Space Racers cadet. Raven is always ready to learn new things and help out if needed. Raven can be overly prideful and selfish, which can cloud his judgement and cause him to do things that he doesn't always think through first. However, he will own up to his mistakes and try to put things right in the end.
 Robyn (Alicyn Packard) is a very smart cadet at the Stardust Space Academy. Robyn is inquisitive and a keen observer, and loves finding about new things from books. A so-called "whiz kid," she is the best precision flyer on the team, as her knowledge of physics gives her a big advantage. Starling is like a younger sister to her.
 Starling (Melissa Hutchison) is a junior cadet at the Stardust Space Academy. While Starling may be small, no one can say she is short of enthusiasm or ambition! She looks up to the older Cadets a lot, especially Eagle, who she wants to be like when she gets older. She also displays a sense of courage that is more suited a rocket twice her size! She is currently in training to become a Space Racer like her friends. Robyn is like an older sister to her.

Recurring

Minor
 AVA (Melissa Hutchison) is the academy AI that runs the systems for the Space Academies and assists all Racers with navigation and any questions they may have.
 Crow (Katie Leigh) is a junior cadet at the Stardust Space Academy, and Sparrow's best friend.
 Sparrow (Alicyn Packard) is a junior cadet at the Stardust Space Academy, and Crow's best friend.
 Headmaster Crane (Phil Lollar): He is the headmaster, and a teacher at the Stardust Space Academy. With years of experience, Crane knows more about space than probably any other craft alive. Quiet and reserved, he is the leader of the Stardust Space Academy, and an accomplished flyer. He is also allergic to flowers as revealed in "The Happiest Rocket in the World".
 Coot (Joseph J. Terry) is an instructor and professor at the Stardust Space Academy.
 Coach Pigeon (Rick Zieff, credited as Danny Katiana for the first season) instructs cadets in flying techniques at the Stardust Space Academy. He was formerly the famous racer, Swift Starlight, which was revealed by Robyn in "Ace Space Reporter", who discovered the truth about his past and agreed not to reveal to anyone else his identity.
 Sandpiper (Katie Leigh) is a famous Space Racer and a well-known explorer. She is roughly the same age as Headmaster Crane, Coot, and Vulture, who she attended Stardust Space Academy together with. As revealed in "Hawk's Valentine", she previously had a crush on Headmaster Crane. 
 Vulture (Joseph J. Terry) is chairman of the school board at the Stardust Space Academy. His full name is Rapacious J. Vulture, who is usually referred to by just his last name. He is infamous for making several selfish schemes around Stardust Bay.
 Dodo (Phil Lollar) is Vulture's bumbling assistant, and helps with all of his schemes.

Other
 Kiwi is a junior cadet at the Stardust Space Academy. Appeared in "Hawk's Valentine".
 Trogon (Rick Zieff) is a Russian rocket scientist who works in the crater, the giant warehouse on Mars, and Deep Space Station Gagarin. He also graduated from the Sputnik Space Academy. Appears in "Cranberry Crater", "Great Balls of Fuel", "Return to Sender", and "M is For Meteorite" (pictured).
 Dinky is an assistant robot created by Coot, who once escaped from Coot's laboratory. Appears in "Three Racers and a Baby Robot", "Paint Your Rocket", "Return to Sender", "That'll Teach You!", and "Ships in a Bottle".
 Merlin is a cadet at the Stardust Space Academy. He was "born" with one wing smaller than the other, and rather than getting it replaced, kept it. Appears in "Different".
 Loon (Rick Zieff) is the eccentric, energetic, and beloved Senior Chief Engineer at Lunar Base Alpha. He is also referred to by Vulture as the Senior Officer at the moon base, and mentions that he has been working on the base since its construction. At one point Eagle asks him how long ago he was "young", to which Loon estimated the time to be 260 years. Appears in "Loon on the Moon".
 Mallard: Hawk's cousin. Appears in "To Tell the Truth".
 Giotto Probe (Allan Neuwirth) is a probe who once tried to help the cadets who were stuck in a Proton storm. Appears in "Them's the Brakes".
 Falcon Fairflight is a famous racer who challenged Swift Starlight to a race. Falcon was another well known racer who raced Swift in the last race of his career. Racing around the moon and back, Swift allowed Falcon to take the lead and then mysteriously disappeared. Falcon ended up winning the race by default. Falcon is also the father of his son, Raven. He currently graduated from the Stardust Space Academy. Appears in "Ace Space Reporter" and "Remember the Past, Discover the Future".
 Kite is a cadet at the Stardust Space Academy who was transferred from another school. He originally bullied Crow when he first arrived. Appears in "New Cadet on the Block".
 Fizzy Finchfuzz (Allan Neuwirth) is the owner of the Fizzy Fuel Pop Company. Appears in "It's a Mad, Mad, Mad, Mad Galaxy".
 Budgie was Hawk's former best friend while growing up, until her family moved away. Mentioned in "The Rocket with Two Brains".
 Sojourner (Katie Leigh) is an original rover found on Mars. Appears in "Mars Map Mystery".
 Lark (Kalynn Harrington) is a junior cadet at the Stardust Space Academy. Appears in "Space Girl Explorers".
 Magpie is a cadet at the Stardust Space Academy. Appears in "Space Girl Explorers".
 Warbler is a cadet at the Stardust Space Academy. Appears in "Space Girl Explorers".
 Questy is a program on the old Quest-1 satellite. He/She was an old friend of AVA. Questy was male in Season 1, but was made female in Season 2.

Roles

Episodes

Production and development
The series concept was developed by Richard Schweiger, who wanted to create a show based around animated vehicles that travel through space. In 2009, Schweiger and Julian Cohen developed the idea into a feature-film script, which won a screenwriting award. In 2010, Schweiger formed the company that would produce Space Racers, and instead of pursuing a film, decided to turn the concept into a television series. The idea developed into fifty individual 11 minute episodes for broadcast.

Collaborations
The Space Racers TV series was produced in collaboration with NASA experts, with input from NASA experts on science-based facts incorporated into the episodes. The show also features NASA scientists and astronauts in live action interstitials. The Space Racers creators have also developed a website where viewers can find a preschool science curriculum on space science, which was developed in collaboration THIRTEEN productions (WNET) and SiiTE.  SpaceRacers.com has a section for family-based education as well for educators and parents. Special screenings of episodes have been held at both the Kennedy Space Center and the Wallops NASA Visitor Center, in collaboration with Maryland Public Television. In July 2014, the Virginia Air and Space Center opened a Space Racers-themed exhibit.

Origins as Space Race (2011–2014)
On March 22, 2011, it originally launched as a web series under the name Space Race. It featured 4 characters/webisodes at launch, with two more webisodes released on April 22, 2011, and the last two on April 29, 2011. In total, there were 8 characters/webisodes (with 2 characters not returning in the TV series). All eight of the characters were interviewed by Gary Galaxy (played by Meyer DeLeeuw), a 3D Galaxy Adventure game, printables, and the “What Spaceship are You?” widget.  As of today, the site and the webisodes (with the exception of the first webisode and trailer) are considered to be lost media.

Relaunch as Space Racers (2014–present)
In late 2013, it was announced that the web series would relaunch as a television series under the new name Space Racers, with most of the characters remodeled and having new roles, along with some new characters. Since 2014, CAKE Television is the international distributor for the show.

Season one of Space Racers consists of 26 half-hour episodes, first airing on May 2, 2014 on selected PBS Kids stations, marking the show's broadcast debut. The first season was co-produced by Maryland Public Television, and distributed by American Public Television. The show's head writer was Allan Neuwirth, its director was Mark Risley, and its executive producers were Brenda Wooding as well as show creators Richard Schweiger and Julian Cohen. Episodes would contain two eleven-minute animated segments, offset by live-action sections between them. The U.S. premiere of the first season was on May 2, 2014. The show's world broadcast debut on February 15, 2014 in New Zealand.

Season two of Space Racers consists of 20 half-hour episodes, first airing on October 31, 2016 on Sprout. The second season was co-produced by WNET, and distributed by NBCUniversal. The show's head writer was again Allan Neuwirth, its director was Mark Risley, and its executive producers were Michael Matays, Charles Matays, and Matthias Schmitt. Episodes contain two eleven-minute animated segments, offset by interstitials, live-action sections, or commercial sections between them. The U.S. premiere of the second season was on October 31, 2016.

As of 2023, it is currently unknown if a third season is happening and which television network or streaming service it will air on.

Broadcast
In the United States of America, the show aired on selected PBS Kids stations from May 2, 2014 to October 30, 2016, and Universal Kids from October 31, 2016 to March 22, 2020.

In Canada, the show aired on Knowledge Kids from May 2, 2014 to November 26, 2015, and TVO Kids from November 27, 2015 to September 9, 2021.

International

Home media

DVD
1091 Pictures released the first two seasons on DVD and Blu-ray Disc on March 8, 2022. The first season was released on three discs, while the second season was released on two discs.

Streaming
The show was first available worldwide on YouTube since May 2, 2014, and Netflix from March 15, 2015 to March 15, 2018, and March 31, 2020 to March 31, 2021. The show was added to Amazon Prime Video, Tubi, Vudu, and Roku on February 25, 2022.

Awards
Space Racers has won several awards in children's broadcasting including the American Public Television (APT) Programming Excellence Award in 2014 and a Parents’ Choice Recommended Award in 2015.

Merchandise
Space Racers merchandise was introduced in November 2018.  There are vehicle toys, plush toys, T-shirts, and Activity and Coloring Books.  Space Racers merchandise is available for view at www.spaceracerstoys.com

References

External links
 

2014 American television series debuts
2010s American animated television series
2010s American science fiction television series
2010s preschool education television series
American children's animated science fantasy television series
American children's animated space adventure television series
American children's animated sports television series
American computer-animated television series
American preschool education television series
Animated preschool education television series
English-language television shows